Major-General  Robert James Blackham  (1868–1951) was an author, barrister, medical doctor and officer in the Royal Army Medical Corps.

Early life 

Blackham was born in Newry on 15 September 1868, the son of Dr. William Semple Blackham and Susan Armstrong. He worked as an Apothecary's apprentice in The Medical Hall, Enniskillen and in 1886 as a doctors assistant in Letterkenny. 

In 1887 he moved to the suburb of Rathmines in Dublin. He studied medicine in The Ledwich School of Medicine in Peter Street and took examinations in The Royal College of Surgeons in Ireland, qualifying in 1892. While studying in Dublin, Blackham worked as a Midwife for the Rotunda Hospital where he travelled the city by bicycle, delivering babies. He obtained a diploma of Midwifery from the Rotunda.

Professional life

Royal Army Medical Corps 
Blackham served in the RAMC from 1895 until 1923 and again from 1939 to 1945. He entered service at Bulford Camp as Surgeon-Lieutenant 29 July 1895. While at Bulford Blackham studied obstetrics and gynaecology as well as general medicine. In order to gain promotion to the rank of Major he took an exam in the newly formed Army Medical College in London. He obtained 99 percent in the specialist examination.

India 

From 1897 to 1899 Blackham served at the Tirah Campaign with the Khyber Brigade, Tirah Field Force. For another two years he toured the Punjab on 'plague duty' (1901-1902). He was made D.A.D.M.S of the First Division Indian Army.

Blackham's arrival in India in 1908 for his second tour coincided with an effort to revive interest in ambulance training. Along with William Frederick Harvey, he created the "Harvey-Blackham" standard pattern of St. John's ambulances in India. He was an experienced lecturer and examiner of the St John Ambulance Association and as an officer he was asked by Lord Kitchener to accept the position of honorary secretary. 

In May 1911 Blackham obtained three months leave and left India to represent The India St. John Ambulance at The Coronation of King George V and Queen Mary. During this leave he also attended The Investiture of the Prince of Wales at Caernarfon Castle.

Blackham received the Distinguished Service Order for ministering to the Viceroy of India, Charles Hardinge, after an assassination attempt by Indian nationalists in 1912. A bomb was thrown at Hardinge's elephant and Blackham dressed the Viceroys wound in his Howdah. Following the event Blackham was put on the staff of the Viceroy as medical advisor and honorary surgeon (1912-1914). He was seconded for service with the Government of India from 14 November 1914 to 31 July 1915.

At King George V 1913 Birthday Honours Blackham was awarded - Companion of the Most Eminent Order of the Indian Empire for commanding the station hospital at Jutogh, Simla.

First World War 

During the First World War Blackham was stationed in India, France, Belgium, Italy and Northern Russia. He was D.A.D.M.S. with the 33rd Division, A.D.M.S. to the 2nd Cavalry Division, A.D.M.S. to the 23rd Division (France) and D.D.M.S. to the 9th Army Corps. He served at the Battle of the Somme and the Battle of Passchendale with the RAMC. He was promoted Lieutenant-Colonel on March 1915 and Colonel on 26 December 1917. Towards the end of the war he became D.D.M.S of the 11th Corps. He wrote about his experiences in the army in his 1931 memoir Scalpel Sword and Stretcher.

Despite Blackham's very active military life during World War One he found time to obtain further medical qualifications, he became F.R.F.P.S.Glas. in 1914, M.R.C.P.Ed. in 1916, and he proceeded M.D. N.U.I in 1918.

Irish Civil War 

During the Irish Civil War (1922-1923) Blackham was posted in Dublin as Assistant Director of Medical Services. He also served as an assistant commissioner with St John Ambulance Ireland during this time.

Legal and civil work 
In 1903, Blackham joined the Middle Temple in London and passed the bar final examination without attending a single lecture. He was also a member of Gray's Inn. He was Called to the Bar by the Middle Temple in 1908. 

On retiring from the army in 1923 Blackham practiced law in the chambers of Sir Travers Humphreys. In 1925 he was elected to the court of Common Council of the Corporation of London. In 1926 he became Assistant Commandant of the City of London Police Reserve. In 1927 he became clerk of the Worshipful Company of Glaziers and Painters of Glass, he was elected honorary assistant to that company in 1949. He also served as Deputy-Governor of The Honourable The Irish Society.

Blackham was a Freeman of the City of London and Liveryman of three of Londons Livery Companies, Apothecaries, Needle-makers and Glaziers. He was the first barrister to hold the office of Under-sheriff of the City of London (1935-1936), a position previously held only by solicitors.

World War Two 

At the outbreak of the second world war Blackham came out of retirement to serve on the Medical Personnel Priority Committee and he oversaw the care of soldiers in civilian hospitals. He was promoted to Major-General in 1941 and retired again in 1945.

Awards
Blackham was highly decorated for his military services, receiving many awards, including the Croix de Guerre (twice awarded), Chevalier of the Legion of Honour, Distinguished Service Order, Kaisar-i-Hind Medal, Companion of the Order of the Indian Empire and special member of the Japanese Red Cross Society. He was five times Mentioned in Dispatches and made Companion of the Order of the Bath.

Writings 
Blackham was a prolific author writing over twenty books on many subjects including England's Royal Family, Indian Culture, Londons Livery Companies, A History of London, as well as many medical textbooks. In 1932 he financed the publication of a collection of poetry by his cousin Henry Hamilton Blackham (1817–1900) titled The Bard of Clanrye which was published by Robert's nephew Aodh de Blácam. At the outbreak of the Second World War in 1939 he wrote a first-aid guide for civilians called "Air Raid First Aid".

Personal life 

Blackham was from an Anglo-Irish Protestant family. In his book 'London - Forever The Sovereign City' he stated that he was a descendant of the Blackham Baronets.

In 1897 Blackham married Charlotte Ellenora Mahoney in Twickenham, London 1897. They had a daughter Veronica Ellenora Blackham-(Butterfield) born in Umbala India (1900-1992). Charlotte died in 1949. He married Louise Irene Oliver that same year and she outlived him passing away in 1976.

Blackham's nephew was the well known writer and journalist Aodh de Blácam (Harold Blackham).

Freemasonry

Blackham's mother lodge was the Aldershot Army and Navy Lodge No. 1971 where he was 'raised' in 1895. 

In 1934 he published a book on the history of the Freemasons called 'Apron Men - The Romance of Freemasonry'. In the book he stated that he introduced the order of the Red Cross of Constantine to India. 

Blackham was present at the initiation of King George VI into Mark Masonry and sat 'under his gavel' when the future King was Worshipful Master of the Grand Master's Mark Lodge. 

Amongst Blackham's masonic titles were;
Senior Grand Overseer 
Grand Sword Bearer 
Great Constable of the Order of the Temple
Grand General of the Order of Constantine 
Chief Adept of the Rosicrucian Society 

Blackham was a member of many masonic lodges including; 
Army and Navy Lodge, No. 1971 (Aldershot, England) 
Royal Somerset House and Inverness Lodge, No. 4 (London, England) 
St. Patrick's Lodge, No. 77 (Newry, Northern Ireland)
Angel Lodge, No. 51 (Colchester, England)
Kitchener Lodge, No. 2998 (Simla, India)
Lodge Khyber, No. 582 (Peshawar)
Triune Brotherhood Lodge No. 2121 (Kasauli, Punjab)
Prince Albert Victor Lodge No. 2370 (Lahore, Punjab)
Roos Keppel Lodge No. 3374 (Dunga Gali, Punjab)
Charity Lodge, No. 563 (Amballa, India)
Elysium Lodge, No. 1031 (New Delhi, India)
Himalaya (Rose Croix) Chapter No. 80
Umballa Chapter No. 563

Blackham Conclave
Blackham founded the 'Blackham Conclave' No. 160 of the Red Cross of Constantine in Simla, India in 1914. In April 1954 the conclave moved to Calcutta and remained there until 1966. In 1967 the conclave moved to Brighton, East Sussex where it continues to this day (as of 2021).

Death 
Blackham died in his home Shortridge Farm, East Sussex on 23 January 1951, aged 82. His funeral was officiated by the Dean of Westminster Alan Don. He was cremated at Golders Green Crematorium.  
In his obituary in the British Medical Journal, Dr. P. T. Parsons-Smith wrote-

Books 
The Care of Children. Practical Hints for mothers and nurses at home and abroad (1906)
The Midwives Pocket Register and Casebook (1907)
Military Sanitation for Soldiers Serving in Hot Climates (1909)
Aids to Tropical Hygiene (1912) 
Tropical hygiene for Anglo-Indians and Indians (1914)
Indian Home Nursing (1915)
The Indian Manual of First Aid (1915) 
Indian Ambulance Training (1915) 
The White Cross of Saint John (1918)
Pocket Guide To First Aid (1920)
Military Sanitation: A Handbook For Soldiers (1922)
The Indian Manual Of First Aid (1926)
A First Course In Hygiene (1928) 
Keep Fit! A Book For Boys (1929)
Scalpel Sword and Stretcher (1931)
'The Soul of the City' London's Livery Companies (1931)
London Forever the Sovereign City, its Romance, its Reality (1932)
'Incomparable India' Tradition Superstition Truth (1932)
'Wig and Gown' The Story of The Temple, Grey's and Lincoln's Inn (1932)
Apron men: The Romance of Freemasonry (1934)
Sir Ernest Wild KC (1935)
Woman: In Honour and Dishonour (1936)
'The Crown and Kingdom' England's Royal Family (1938)
Air Raid First Aid (1939)
The Worshipful Company of Glaziers and Painters of Glass, and the Temple Church (1948)

Articles

The Lancet 
The Posology of the Pharmacopeia. 21 January 1893
Proposed Scotch Medical Schools and Graduate's Association. 29 July 1893  
Bradycardia in Health. 22 August 1903
Goats Milk for Infants. 29 September 1906
Pneumonia in Alcoholic Subjects. 6 October 1906
Tropical Dysentery. 1 December 1906 
The Microscope in War. 4 January 1908 
The French Medical Service in the Field. 2 October 1920
Milk in the Tropics. 4 December 1920
Dried Milk in Infantile Scurvy. 7 October 1922
Cows Milk in Infant Feeding: A Correction. 13 October 1923
Dried Milk Regulations. 17 May 1924
Soldiers Doctor. 26 September 1942

Nursing Mirror and Midwives Journal 
Rare Diseases of Returning Service Men: Beri-Beri 12 Jan 1946
Rare Diseases of Returning Service Men: Pellagra 2 Feb 1946
Rare Diseases of Returning Service Men: Ancylostomiasis 9 Feb 1946
Rare Diseases of Returning Service Men: Schistosomiasis 16 Feb 1946
Rare Diseases of Returning Service Men: Leishmaniasis 23 Feb 1946
Harley Street, Home of Physicians. 27 Sep 1947  
Medical Problems for Nurse and Midwife. 11 Sep 1948

Journal Of The Royal Army Medical Corps 
Varicocele as a Military Disability. Feb 1905
The Employment of Non-Commissioned Officers as Sanitary Inspectors. Jun 1905
The Goux System and its Application to India. Jun 1906
Night Urinals: A Suggestion. Jan 1907
An Epitome of the Midwives Act, 1902. Feb 1907
Moestig-Moorhof's Method of Treating Bone Cavities. Apr 1907
The Teaching Of Hygiene In Medical Schools. July 1907
The Statistics of Military Families Hospitals. Sep 1907
A Case of Eclampsia. Oct 1907
A Note on the Service Watercart. Nov 1907
A Rare Form of Fracture of Patella. Dec 1907
The Treatment of Dysentery. Apr 1908
The Red Cross of Geneva. Oct 1908
The Micro-Organisms of Dysentery. Dec 1908
Sanitation Classes for Soldiers. Jan 1910
The North-West Frontier of India. Sep 1910 
Milk In India. Feb 1911
The Sanitary Organisation of the Imperial and Indian Armies, With Sanitary Lessons from and Oriental Campaign. August 1912
Sand-Flies and Sand-Fly Fever on the Northwest Frontier of India. Oct 1912
The Soldier's Head Dress. Dec 1913
Pyrexias of Doubtful Origin in an Infantry Battalion on Active Service. Feb 1918 
Wheeled Stretcher Carrier Adaptions for Trench and Mountain Warfare. June 1919
An Emergency Medical Service. Apr 1943
Reflections of a Former Military Registrar. May 1944 
The American Army Medical Services in the Field. Apr 1946

Journal of the Royal Sanitary Institute 
Infant Mortality. 1 July 1907
The Relation of Protozoa to Preventable Disease. 1 Aug 1908
The Health Visitor in India. 1 Oct 1910
Cheese: Its Position in History, Commerce and Dietetics. 1 Oct 1910
The Disposal of Refuse in the Tropics. 1 Oct 1911
Dried Milk as a Food. 1 Mar 1920
The Milk Problem in Hot Climates. 1 Jul 1921 
Carbohydrates in Nutrition. 1 Sep 1929

The British Medical Journal 
Therapeutics of Chloralose. 1893 
Case of Metatarsalgia. 28 Mar 1903
Varicella Gangrenosa. 4 Nov 1905
Goat's Milk for Infants. 25 Aug 1906
The Teaching of Hygiene in the Army. 31 Aug 1907
The Feeding of the Soldier in Barracks, In Hospital and in War. 8 Aug 1908
The Regimental Medical Officer: His Powers and Duties. 25 Dec 1920
Cows Milk in Infant Feeding. 25 Aug 1923
Sea-Sickness. 22 July 1939
Economy of Medical Man-power. 14 Feb 1942

Perspectives in Public Health 
Infant Welfare Work in India. 1 May 1924

Journal of State Medicine 
Infant Feeding in Warm Climates. Vol 45, 1937

External links

Distinguished in five professions

Visiting Colonel's Life Of Many Adventures
Scalpel, sword and stretcher; forty years of work and play (1931) (scanned edition, borrowable)

References 

1868 births
1951 deaths
British Army major generals
British Army personnel of World War I
Chevaliers of the Légion d'honneur
Companions of the Distinguished Service Order
Companions of the Order of the Bath
Companions of the Order of the Indian Empire
Companions of the Order of St Michael and St George
Members of the Middle Temple
Recipients of the Croix de Guerre (France)
Recipients of the Kaisar-i-Hind Medal
Royal Army Medical Corps officers
Military personnel from Newry